Mauro Alexandre Rodrigues Sousa Carvalho Bastos (born 17 April 1979) is a Portuguese professional footballer who plays for C.D. Pinhalnovense as a striker.

References

External links

1979 births
Living people
Footballers from Lisbon
Portuguese footballers
Association football forwards
Primeira Liga players
Liga Portugal 2 players
Segunda Divisão players
Caldas S.C. players
F.C. Barreirense players
Gil Vicente F.C. players
C.D. Olivais e Moscavide players
C.D. Mafra players
C.D. Fátima players
C.D. Tondela players
G.D. Chaves players
Sertanense F.C. players
Clube Oriental de Lisboa players
1. FC Schweinfurt 05 players
Segunda División B players
Burgos CF footballers
Portuguese expatriate footballers
Expatriate footballers in Germany
Expatriate footballers in Spain
Expatriate footballers in Angola
C.D. Pinhalnovense players